Worleston railway station was located just north of the small village of Worleston, Cheshire, England.

History
Opened 1 October 1840 by the Grand Junction Railway, it was served by what was the Chester and Crewe Railway (now part of the North Wales Coast Line) between Chester, Cheshire and Crewe, Cheshire.

The station was originally named Nantwich until the town got its own station in 1858. There were two platforms, the brick built ticket office being on the down platform and a wooden waiting room on the up platform. Both were connected by a footbridge. The station closed to passengers in 1952 and to goods traffic in 1959.

References

Further reading

Disused railway stations in Cheshire
Former London and North Western Railway stations
Railway stations in Great Britain opened in 1840
Railway stations in Great Britain closed in 1952